Connecticut's 35th State Senate district elects one member of the Connecticut State Senate. It consists of the communities of Ashford, Chaplin, Coventry, Eastford, Ellington (part), Hampton, Pomfret, Stafford, Tolland, Union, Vernon, Willington, and Woodstock. It has been represented by Republican Dan Champagne since 2019.

List of Senators

Recent elections

2020

2018

2016

2014

2012

References

35